Verlinsky is a Russian surname. Notable people with the surname include:

Yury Verlinsky (1943–2009), Russian-American medical researcher
Boris Verlinsky (1888–1950), Soviet chess player

Russian-language surnames